Tan Sri Mohd Bakri bin Omar (10 September 1948 – 10 November 2014) was an Inspector General of Police who serving from 5 November 2003 to 11 September 2007.

Born in Manjung, Perak, Bakri began his service as an Assistant Superintendent Cadet on 1 January 1971, and like most other officers, has undergone basic police training at Police Training Center (PULAPOL). He became Kedah Police Chief in 1996 and Kuala Lumpur Police Chief in 1997. Then, in 2002, he was appointed as Deputy Inspector General of Police. When Tan Sri Norian Mai retired on 5 November 2003, Bakri was appointed his replacement.

Police career
Mersing District Police Chief (1972 - 1973)
Balik Pulau District Police Chief, Penang (1974 - 1977)
Petaling Jaya District Police Chief (1987 - 1989)
Deputy Commander of College of Senior Police Officers, Kuala Kubu Bahru (1984 - 1986)
Head of Kuala Lumpur Criminal Investigation Department (1989 - 1994)
Sabah Police Commissioner (1994)
Kedah Police Chief (1996 - 1997)
Kuala Lumpur Police Chief (1997-1998)
Director General of National Drug Agency (1999)
Director of Management Department (1999 - 2002)
Deputy Inspector General of Police (2002)
Inspector General of Police (2003 - 2006)

Death
Bakri died on 10 November 2014 at the National Cancer Institute due to cancer.

Honours
  :
  Officer of the Order of the Defender of the Realm (KMN) (1985)
  Companion of the Order of the Defender of the Realm (JMN) (1996)
  Commander of the Order of the Defender of the Realm (PMN) – Tan Sri (2004)
  Royal Malaysia Police :
  Loyal Commander of the Most Gallant Police Order (PSPP) (1997)
  :
  Commander of the Order of Kinabalu (PGDK) – Datuk (1994)
  Grand Commander of the Order of Kinabalu (SPDK) – Datuk Seri Panglima (2005)
  :
  Knight Grand Commander of the Order of Taming Sari (SPTS) – Dato’ Seri Panglima (2002)
 :
 Grand Knight of the Order of the Crown of Pahang (SIMP) – formerly Dato’, now Dato’ Indera (2003)
 Grand Knight of the Order of Sultan Ahmad Shah of Pahang (SSAP) – Dato’ Sri (2004)
 :
 Knight Commander of the Order of Loyalty to Sultan Abdul Halim Mu'adzam Shah (DHMS) – Dato’ Paduka (2005)
 :
 Knight Grand Commander of the Order of the Life of the Crown of Kelantan (SJMK) – Dato’ (2005)
 :
 Knight Commander of the Most Exalted Order of the Star of Sarawak (PNBS) – Dato Sri (2006)

References

1948 births
2014 deaths
Malaysian police officers
Malaysian police chiefs
People from Perak
Officers of the Order of the Defender of the Realm
Companions of the Order of the Defender of the Realm
Commanders of the Order of the Defender of the Realm
Commanders of the Order of Kinabalu
Grand Commanders of the Order of Kinabalu
Knights Commander of the Most Exalted Order of the Star of Sarawak
Deaths from cancer in Malaysia